Bernie Gaughan is a retired American football coach. He served as the head coach at Assumption College in Worcester, Massachusetts, guiding that program from club status from 1983 to 1987 up to NCAA Division II varsity status from 1988 to 1995.

A graduate of the University of Tampa, Guaghan also coached high school athletic coach in Little Compton, Rhode Island and Clinton, Massachusetts.

Head coaching record
(Note: Only includes 4–year varsity records)

References

Year of birth missing (living people)
Living people
Tampa Spartans football players
Assumption Greyhounds football coaches